Artistic Gymnastics was one of the seven sports of the 2011 Commonwealth Youth Games. Between 9 and 11 September 2011, the girls' events were held in Manx Gymnastics Centre of Excellence and the boys' events were held at the Ellan Vannin Gymnastics Club, both in Douglas, Isle of Man. Artistic gymnastics was previously held at the Commonwealth Youth Games in 2004 and 2000, but it has not been held since.

Each Commonwealth Games Association could send a team of up to three athletes in girls and boys each. The age limit for the girls' events was 13-15 (born 1996-1998) and for boys, it was 14-18 (born 1993-1997). In the girls competition, twenty-eight gymnasts from thirteen countries competed, and in the boys event, twenty-six gymnasts from twelve countries competed.

England won both the boys and girls team titles. Dominick Cunningham from England was the most successful gymnast of the event with three gold medals, one silver medal, and one bronze medal. Overall, England was the most successful country of the event- winning eight out of the fourteen gold medal awarded as well as five silver medals and five bronze medals.

Medal summary

References 

Commonwealth Youth Games
Gymnastics
International sports competitions hosted by the Isle of Man